Kishoreganj Cricket Stadium (also known as Kishoreganj New Stadium ) is located by the District Election Commission Office, Kishoreganj, Bangladesh. Mukul niketon is a popular house near the stadium.

See also
Stadiums in Bangladesh
List of cricket grounds in Bangladesh
Kishoreganj Football Stadium
Sheikh Kamal International Stadium, Cox's Bazar
Sheikh Kamal International Stadium, Gopalganj

References

Cricket grounds in Bangladesh